Spodnje Kraše is a settlement on the Dreta River in the Municipality of Nazarje in Slovenia. The area belongs to the traditional region of Styria and is now included in the Savinja Statistical Region.

References

External links
Spodnje Kraše on Geopedia
 Spodnje Kraše weather station

Populated places in the Municipality of Nazarje